Túró Rudi is the name of a curd snack which has been popular in Hungary since 1968. The bar is composed of a thin chocolate-flavored outer coating and an inner filling of túró (curd). The "Rudi" in the product name comes from the Hungarian "rúd", which translates to rod or bar (and is also a nickname for the name "Rudolf"). Túró Rudi can be made in several different flavours and sizes.

The basic (plain, "natúr") bar is cheaper and more popular and comes in two sizes: the classic  bar and the large ("óriás", giant)  bar. There are differently-flavoured varieties of the bar, like apricot, strawberry and raspberry as jams in the túró, but coconut and vanilla are flavorings. Also nut and caramel flavours are available. The plain bar can be found with dark chocolate outer coating.

The "pöttyös" (spotty or spotted with polka dots) theme is part of the marketing scheme of the bar, and the distinctive red polka-dots are readily associated with Túró Rudi by regular consumers. Friesland Hungária, Inc. (which claims to be the manufacturer of the "original" Túró Rudi) released its product in Slovakia, Romania, Spain and Italy under the name DOTS in 2003. The version sold in Western Europe is said to be sweeter and comes with a milk-chocolate coating to suit the taste of locals.

Its first public appearance was in a Hungarian family film, Kismaszat és a Gézengúzok (roughly translated to Little Smear and the Scapegraces) in the 1980s.

The regular 30-gram bar and the óriás bar usually retail for about 95 Hungarian forints (about 25 cents) and 140 Hungarian forints (about 40 cents), respectively.

Origin 
The earliest form of Túró Rudi appeared in Russia under the name Cырок (Syrok meaning syr-cheese curd snack), a rectangular bar of curd, butter and fat mixed together, covered with dark chocolate coating. Its coating is thinner and the filling is sweeter. It is widely acknowledged that Túró Rudi was based on it, as design and production began after a study trip to the Soviet Union (presumably by Antal Deák). Sándor Klein, a teacher at the Budapest University of Technology, gave the product its name, which raised a bit of controversy as people thought the name was vulgar and had pornographic associations due to the fact that Rudi translates to bar or rod in Hungarian. Regardless, the name stayed, and throughout the 1970s the candy proved both popular and successful. Production moved from Budapest to Mátészalka and eventually grew to several additional factories throughout the 1980s.

Different versions 
The original Túró Rudi has gone through many changes during the years, and many different manufacturer has its own Túró Rudi product. Opinions on which of them is the best usually vary a lot. Although the brand name is legally owned by Pöttyös, a few manufacturers claim that their product is much closer to the "original" Túró Rudi, mainly because it contains real túró (curd) and other unspecified "dairy products" or pickled vegetable fats.

Health controversy 
From the beginning of its production, Túró Rudi was marketed as a "healthy dessert", an opinion strongly supported by nutritional experts of the time. Later examinations however showed some less positive results. While the filling of several (but not all) Túró Rudi has genuine, good quality curd; the coating is not chocolate as many believe. It is a mixture of cocoa powder, hydrogenated vegetable fat, sugar and butter, containing several grams (0.2–0.3 oz) of trans fat which is believed to be one of the main causes of obesity and cardiovascular diseases .

However Túró Rudi sales remain unbroken, the general public and experts opposing such concerns usually label these comments as an attempt to create hysteria, pointing out that the consumption of few bars per day is completely harmless, as it contains far less sugar and fat compared to most chocolate or dessert products on the market.

Desserts with a similar composition, but coated with real chocolate, though usually not bearing the Túró Rudi name, are available from other manufacturers in Hungary.

International versions

Austria 

The Austrian company Landfrisch has also started selling its version of the bar, admittedly copied from the original Túró Rudi, under the name Landfrisch Rudi.

The 'Landfrisch Rudi' is also coated with chocolate, unlike its Hungarian predecessor, and in addition to the 'plain' version, it's also sold in vanilla and coconut flavors.

China 
In China, a copy of the product has been sold since October 2008 under the name Túró Kiittyy  (Image).

Poland 
In Poland, Danone is distributing the product originally known as Danone Túró Rudi under the trademark Danio Batonik.

Russia 
In Russia, as well as in many post-Soviet states, the original version of the product can still be found in a rectangular and slightly softer form, which, again, is sweeter than the Hungarian one.

Culture 
 Túró Rudi, from the name Rudolf, is the name given to the Red Baron in the Hungarian translation of the Richard Scarry children's books.
 The Hungarian band 100 Folk Celsius have a song about Túró Rudi.
 There is a short movie titled Túró Rudi by János Kellár

References

External links 
 Official Túró Rudi Website
 They Really Weren’t Joking About Taking Túró Rudi to China
 Túró Rudi Fanlisting and general description of Túró

Chocolate bars
Hungarian cuisine
Cheese dishes